Kennedy Chihuri  (born 2 April 1969) is a retired Zimbabwean footballer who played 200 matches in the Czech First League, almost all of them for FK Viktoria Žižkov. He was the first black player in the Czech league. He won the Czech Cup with Žižkov in the 2000–01 season. Chihuri made 30 appearances for the Zimbabwe national football team.

References

External links

Vďačný za desať rokov v strednej Európe 

1969 births
Living people
Zimbabwean footballers
Zimbabwe international footballers
Association football midfielders
Chapungu United F.C. players
Czech First League players
SK Slavia Prague players
FK Viktoria Žižkov players
1. FC Tatran Prešov players
Slovak Super Liga players
Zimbabwean expatriate sportspeople in the Czech Republic
Zimbabwean expatriate sportspeople in Slovakia
Expatriate footballers in the Czech Republic
Expatriate footballers in Slovakia